Zips (also Siggies or Geeps) is a slang term in the United States that was especially in use in the early 20th century. It was often used as a derogatory slur by Italian American and Sicilian American mobsters in reference to newer immigrant Sicilian and Italian mafiosi. The mobsters in the US were said to have difficulty understanding the Sicilian dialects of the new immigrants, in which words appeared to "zip" by. Other theories include pejorative uses, such as Sicilians' preference for homemade zip guns.  According to another theory, the term is a contraction of a Sicilian slang term for "hicks" or "primitives". The older Sicilian mafiosi of the pre-Prohibition era, known as "Mustache Petes", were also referred to as "zips". They were deposed by American-born mobsters during the Castellammarese War.

Arrival in the United States
With increasing violence and government presence in Italy, Sicilians and Neapolitans alike found positions in the growing drug trafficking market of New York City's Five Families in the early 20th century. The Pizza Connection, a heroin-trafficking operation involving Salvatore Catalano, a capo of the Bonanno crime family, and Gaetano Badalamenti, a Sicilian mafioso, was largely organized by Zips. The Zips were effective because they were unknown in the United States and had no police records. They generally congregated in the Knickerbocker Avenue area.

The younger Sicilian mafiosi became known for their reckless and undisciplined behavior, which gained unwanted attention for New York's crime families. The Zips had no qualms about murdering people who had been considered off-limits by the American Mafia, such as police officers, judges, and women and children.  They were also known for using bombs to kill their targets. Although bombings were commonly used by the Sicilian Mafia, American mafiosi have usually shied away from bombs out of concern that they could put innocent people at risk. Zips were also known to have killed victims who were terminally ill. In the Sicilian Mafia, when someone is marked for death, that person cannot be allowed to die of natural causes.

The group was tolerated because they earned millions for the families, specifically the Bonanno and Gambino families. Both Carmine Galante and Carlo Gambino used zips for running narcotics and conducting murders. Galante's two personal bodyguards Cesare Bonventre and Baldo Amato, were Zips.

Many Italian-American mobsters distrusted the Zips. Bonanno soldier Benjamin "Lefty" Ruggiero explained in a conversation to undercover FBI agent Joseph "Donnie Brasco" Pistone: 
"Lots of people hate him [Galante]... There's only a few people he's close to. And that's mainly the Zips... Those guys are always with him. He brought them over from Sicily, and he uses them for different pieces of work and for dealing all that junk [drugs]. They're as mean as he is. You can't trust those bastard Zips. Nobody can. Except the Old Man."
On another occasion, Ruggiero told Pistone, "They hate the American people. They hate the American wiseguys." Bonanno soldier Anthony Mirra told Pistone, "The Zips are clannish and secretive. They are the meanest killers in the business".

See also
Fresh off the boat
A Full Ounce of Drugs

References

Kelly, Robert J. Encyclopedia of Organized Crime in the United States. Westport, Connecticut: Greenwood Press, 2000. 
Sifakis, Carl. The Mafia Encyclopedia. New York: Facts On File Inc., 2005. 
Pistone, Joseph D.; & Brandt, Charles (2007). Donnie Brasco: Unfinished Business, Running Press. .
Pistone, Joseph D.; & Woodley, Richard (1999) Donnie Brasco: My Undercover Life in the Mafia, Hodder & Stoughton. .
Raab, Selwyn. The Five Families: The Rise, Decline & Resurgence of America's Most Powerful Mafia Empire. New York: St. Martins Press, 2005.
Crittle, Simon, The Last Godfather: The Rise and Fall of Joey Massino Berkley (March 7, 2006) 
DeStefano, Anthony. The Last Godfather: Joey Massino & the Fall of the Bonanno Crime Family. California: Citadel, 2006.

Further reading
Sterling, Claire. Octopus: The Long Reach of the International Sicilian Mafia. 1990.

American gangsters of Sicilian descent
Organized crime terminology
American Mafia
Italian language in the United States